J4/J04, J-4/J-04 or J.4/J.04 may refer to:

In science and academia 

 ATC code J04 Antimycobacterials, a subgroup of the Anatomical Therapeutic Chemical Classification System
 Janko group J4, in mathematics
 S/2003 J 4, a natural satellite of Jupiter
 J04 : acute laryngitis and tracheitis ICD-10 code
 Square cupola, Johnson Solid number 4

In military 

 Mikoyan-Gurevich MiG-15, Chinese designation of this Soviet-made aircraft is J-4
 HMAS J4, an Australian Royal Navy submarine which saw service during World War I
 Junkers J 4, a 1917 German sesquiplane format warplane 
 J4F was the U.S. Navy's designation for the Grumman Widgeon seaplane.

In transportation 
 Airmak J4, an Italian microlight aircraft design
 Auster J-4, a 1946 British single-engined two-seat high-wing touring monoplane
 Morris Commercial J4, van made from 1960 to 1974 under the marques of Morris initially, and later, Austin and BMC
 County Route J4 (California), a road in the United States
 GS&WR Class J4, a Great Southern and Western Railway Irish steam locomotive
 JAC J4, a subcompact car
 Malaysia Federal Route J4, a major road in Johor, Malaysia
 Peterson J-4 Javelin, glider
 Piper J-4, a 1939 trainer aircraft
 Buffalo Airways International Air Transport Association code
 GNR Class J4, a class of British 0-6-0 steam locomotives

Other 

 Jaws: The Revenge, also known Jaws 4
 Jarvan IV, a champion in League of Legends
 Samsung Galaxy J4; a smartphone made by Samsung